Mbala Airport  is an airport serving Mbala, Northern Province, Zambia. Runway 12 has a displaced threshold of  that can be used for takeoff.

See also
Transport in Zambia
List of airports in Zambia

References

External links
FallingRain - Mbala Airport
OpenStreetMap - Mbala
OurAirports - Mbala

Airports in Zambia
Buildings and structures in Northern Province, Zambia